General elections were held in Bangladesh on 27 February 1991. The Bangladesh Nationalist Party (BNP) emerged as the largest party in parliament, winning 140 of the 300 directly-elected seats. The BNP formed a government with the support of the Islamic party Jamaat-e-Islami, and on 20 March Khaleda Zia was sworn in for her first term as Prime Minister.

The elections were described to be free and fair by many international observers, and it played a major role in solidifying Bangladeshi democracy in aftermath of the anti-government protests in late 1980s. Voter turnout was 55.4%.

Background
In 1990 a popular mass uprising led by future Prime Ministers Khaleda Zia and Sheikh Hasina deposed the former Army Chief Hussain Muhammad Ershad from the Presidency in December. Ershad had assumed the Presidency in 1983 following a coup d'état in 1982.

The previous parliamentary elections had been held in 1988 and saw Ershad's Jatiya Party win 251 of the 300 seats. However, the elections had been boycotted by all major opposition parties and were described by one Western diplomat as "a mockery of an election". On 6 December 1990, the day of Ershad's resignation, parliament was dissolved and new elections were scheduled for 2 March 1991, but subsequently advanced to 27 February, with all major political parties participating.

Electoral system
The 330 members of the Jatiya Sangsad consisted of 300 directly elected seats using first-past-the-post voting in single-member constituencies, and an additional 30 seats reserved for women. The reserved seats are distributed based on the proportional vote share of the contesting parties. Each parliament sits for a five-year term.

Results
The elections saw the BNP win 140 seats, 11 short of a parliamentary majority. The BNP's primary rivals, the Awami League, led by Sheikh Hasina, won only 88 seats. However, there was little difference between the two main parties in terms of the popular vote share, with BNP only receiving around 250,000 votes more than the Awami League.

Of the directly elected 300 seats, only four were won by female candidates. Following the elections, the BNP won 28 of the 30 reserved seats for women.

Aftermath
In September 1991 a constitutional referendum was held, which sought the transfer of executive powers from the President to the Prime Minister, making the presidency largely a ceremonial role. The vote was overwhelmingly in favour of the constitutional amendments and the country returned to being a parliamentary democracy in line with its founding constitution.

References

General
General elections in Bangladesh
Bangladesh